The Car-Nation (also known as Carnation) was a brand of automobile manufactured in Detroit, Michigan, by the American Voiturette Company from 1913 to 1914.

The Car-Nation roadster was an  cyclecar costing $495.  The vehicle had a four-cylinder Herreshoff "25" engine and a three-speed transmission.

Car-Nation also manufactured a larger four-seat Tourer model with a base price of $520. They also advertised a fore-and-aft tandem; it's not known if more than a few prototypes were produced. Two roadsters and five touring cars are known to survive.

In 1912, former Pope-Toledo manager Forrest Keeton moved his Keeton Towncar Works into a factory in Wyandotte, Michigan, a city south of Detroit on the shore of the Detroit River, and formed the Keeton Motor Company. He began construction of his first “French-like” car, the big Renault-influenced, air-cooled Keeton. It sold well enough to allow Keeton in 1913 to launch a second line of continental-influenced, low priced cars under a new name: Car-Nation. All that activity apparently attracted the attention of oil magnate Charles Schaeffer, and shortly after the introduction of the new car, the short-lived Car-Nation Motorette Co. and the existing Keeton Motor Co. unified under his ownership, reincorporating as the American Voiturette Company in Detroit.

Slow acceptance of the Car-Nation's nonstandard  gauge and reported problems with the Herreshoff engines in the Car-Nation sent the company into receivership in 1914. At a public auction in February 1915, Forest Keeton appears to have bought the assets of the company, including 60 Keetons and 350 Car-Nations, along with machine tools and countless thousands of parts. But while he did supply repairs, he never again built a car.

Specifications (1913 Car-Nation roadster) 

ENGINE Type: Herreshoff cast-iron L-head straight-four, integral valves, cast-en-bloc, Displacement , Bore × stroke  x , Horsepower 18 (25 A.L.A.M.), Main bearings 2 nickel babbitt, Fuel system Gravity, Zenith updraft carburetor, alloy intake manifold, Ignition system 6-volt, Splitdorf fixed-spark magneto, Lubrication system Splash; plunger pump (note: Car-Nation advertised pressure lubrication, but it does not appear on any of the known cars), Exhaust system Single, iron

TRANSMISSION Type:Three-speed Detroit Gear & Machine sliding gear, cone clutch (note: early cars appear to have used an alloy clutch plate. Prone to cracking, later versions have a cast-iron clutch plate)

DIFFERENTIAL Type: Weston-Mott semi-floating

STEERING Type: Adjustable worm gear

BRAKES Type: Rod-actuated manual, Front - None, Rear -1¼ x  internal expanding emergency; external contracting service on transmission shaft

CHASSIS & BODY Construction: Full-frame riveted 1/8-inch channel steel, 1x3 ash sills, composite body, Body style - One door, two-passenger roadster, Layout - Front engine, rear-wheel drive

SUSPENSION Front - Quarter-elliptic leaf springs, Rear - Quarter-elliptic leaf springs

WHEELS & TIRES Wheels -Detachable Detroit Stanweld wire, Front/rear 30 x 3 inches

WEIGHTS & MEASURES  - Wheelbase , Overall length , Overall width , Overall height ;  with top, Front track , Rear track , Shipping weight 

CAPACITIES Crankcase 3 quarts, Cooling system 8 quarts, Fuel tank , Transmission 8 pints, Rear axle 4 pints

CALCULATED DATA - bhp per c.i.d. 7.44, Weight per bhp , Weight per c.i.d. 

PERFORMANCE - Top speed , Fuel mileage , 

PRODUCTION - Car-Nation, total est. 2,000

See also
Brass Era car

References

External links 

 ConceptCars.com, photos of a 1913 Car-Nation roadster
 photos of 1913 Car-Nation Tourer with description in French
  NOBODY'S DUST: Cyclecars like the Car-Nation are almost forgotten now—but Henry Ford once worried they'd kill the Model T

Defunct motor vehicle manufacturers of the United States
Motor vehicle manufacturers based in Michigan
Cyclecars
Defunct companies based in Michigan
Brass Era vehicles
1910s cars